Al-Hariqa is a neighborhood in Damascus, Syria. It lies inside the walls of the old city south of the Citadel of Damascus between the late-Ottoman-era markets of al-Hamidiyah Souq and Medhat Pasha Souq. The neighborhood was known as Sidi Amoud after a famous holy man who was buried there. It was called al-Hariqa (Conflagration) after the area was completely burned down in 1925 under French bombing in response to the Great Syrian Revolt. It is a commercial hub famous for its clothing markets. The famous Nur al-Din Bimaristan is located in the area.

References

Neighborhoods of Damascus